Juan Treviño may refer to:

 Juan Daniel García Treviño (born 2000), Mexican singer, actor and dancer
 Juan Francisco Treviño (fl. 1670s), Governor of New Mexico
 Juan Treviño de Guillamas (died before 1636), Spanish governor of Florida and Venezuela

See also
 Treviño (surname)